Dorte Oppelstrup Jensen (born 20 October 1972 in Nyborg) is a Danish competitive sailor and Olympic medalist. She won a silver medal in the Yngling class at the 2004 Summer Olympics in Athens, together with Helle Jespersen and Christina Otzen.

References

External links

1972 births
Living people
Danish female sailors (sport)
Sailors at the 1992 Summer Olympics – Europe
Sailors at the 2004 Summer Olympics – Yngling
Olympic sailors of Denmark
Olympic bronze medalists for Denmark
Olympic medalists in sailing
Medalists at the 2004 Summer Olympics
Europe class world champions
World champions in sailing for Denmark
People from Nyborg
Sportspeople from the Region of Southern Denmark